Xavier Miserachs i Ribalta  (July 12, 1937 – August 14, 1998) was a Spanish photographer. He studied medicine at the University of Barcelona, but left school to be a photographer. He exhibited his work in Barcelona from 1956. His work is reminiscent of neorealism and is representative of the years of Spanish economic recovery, 1950–1960. His photographs show him as a creator of a new image of the city and its people. In 1998 he received the Creu de Sant Jordi of the Catalan government.

Biography 
Miserachs was born in Barcelona on July 12, 1937, in the middle of the Spanish Civil War. He was the son of a hematologist and a librarian, Manuel Miserachs and Montserrat Ribalta. He discovered photography at the Technical Institute of Santa Eulàlia, in Barcelona, where he met Ramon Fabregat and his brother Antonio. He studied four courses of a career in medicine, but left shortly before the end to embark on a career as a professional photographer.

In 1952, he became a member of the Photographic Association of Catalonia (Agrupació Fotogràfica de Catalunya), where he became friends with Oriol Maspons. He first exhibited at the headquarters of the Photographic Association of Catalonia in 1957, along with Ricard Terré and Ramon Masats. In 1959 they presented work together again in the Sala Aixelà of Barcelona. He began his professional career in 1959, when Xavier Busquets commissioned him to guide Picasso in his drawings of the facade of the College of Architects of Catalonia.

In 1961, after returning from military service, Miserachs wanted independence, and set up his first studio in Casa David at Carrer Tuset in Barcelona. He began photographing on request and for book authors with his work appearing in books such as Barcelona Blanc i Negre (with 400 photographs recounting the war in Barcelona) and Costa Brava Show.

During the 1960s he also served as a news reporter for Spanish magazines. In 1968 he signed an exclusive contract with the Revista Triunfo. He also published several articles in La Vanguardia, Gaceta Ilustrada, Interviú, Bazaar and Magazin. He was thus able to witness such historic events as May 68, Swinging London and Prague Spring. Miserachs engaged mainly in editorial photography but also did work doing reports.

In January 1967 he co-founded the Escola Eina, where he was one of the first professors of photography. He occasionally frequented Boccaccio's, then the meeting place par excellence of the gauche divine. In 1997 he published his memoir, contact sheets, which won a Gaziel prize.

Miserachs died on August 14, 1998, aged 61, in the Hospital Germans Trias i Pujol in Badalona from lung cancer.

Works

Features 
Miserachs was the youngest member of a group of photographers led by Francesc Català-Roca. The group's other members were: Oriol Maspons, Ricard Terré, Paco Ontañón, Leopold Pomés, and Ramon Masats.

At the time, the only photography magazine was Arte Fotografico, founded by the Ignacio Barceló in 1952, which featured mostly amateur photography. It was announced that Josep M. Casademont would assume the role of promoter between the theoretical and Catalan photographers. In 1963 he published his own magazine, Image and Sound, taking the same direction of Sala Aixelà of Barcelona. Here, Casademont describes the group's work as neorealist:

His publication in Barcelona, Blanc y Negre, in 1964, was a significant event in Miserachs's career. The book also looked upon the sour and chaotic urban world as they complete the visions of Barcelona (Wolfgang Weber, 1929 and Català-Roca, 1954), and went beyond charming and picturesque character, conveying a new sensitivity.

Films 
Miserachs had a brief foray with film, making underground movie shots with some of his friends Enrique Vila-Matas, Emma Cohen and Jordi Cadena. Later he directed and produced his own short film, Amén historieta muda (Amen dumb cartoon.) He made the film still from Juguetes rotos, directed by Manuel Summers, in 1966.

Legacy

Memorials 
In 2001 the first Xavier Miserachs Photography Award was held in Barcelona, a black and white photography contest named after the author for his work in Barcelona Blanc i Negre.

In 1998 the town of Palafrugell named a route between the beaches of Calella de Palafrugell and Llafranc after Miserachs. The Biennial of Photography Xavier Miserachs, dedicated to documentary photography, is also held in Palafrugell. In the biennials of 1999, 2004, 2008 and 2010 exhibitions were held of Miserachs' work.

The exhibition hall on the ground floor of the Palace of the Viceroy's wife in Barcelona was, between December 17, 1998, and 2010, named in honour of Miserachs. In 2010, Xavier Sala Miserachs moved to the old Hall of Numismatics, and the ground floor was renamed Virreina Lab.

Archive 
Miserachs' archive includes approximately 60,000 negatives, 20,000 slides, 2,500 contact sheets, notebooks with personal notes, administrative documentation, and part of his personal library. Since 2011 it has been housed in the Research and Documentation Center Museum of Contemporary Art in Barcelona.

Books 
He published several photo books, most with text in Catalan or Spanish.

Main exhibits 
 1957 – Photographic Association of Catalonia, Barcelona; Photographic Association of Almeria (AFAL); and Royal Photographic Society of Madrid. I Terré-Miserachs-Masats.
 1959 – Sala Aixelà, Barcelona. Terré-Miserachs-Masats, directed by Josep Maria Casademont.
 1982 – Galeria René Metras, Barcelona. Fotografia catalana als anys 50–60. With Leopold Pomés and Francesc Català-Roca.
 1987 – Barcelona Metrópolis. Installation at the Gran Via of Barcelona from a collective exhibition with Colita, Oriol Maspons and Francesc Català-Roca.
 1991 – Grupo AFAL 1956–1991.
 1992 – Centre d'Art Santa Mònica. Temps de Silenci.
 1992 – Fundació "la Caixa". 1 segon i 25-centèsimes. Directed by Alain Dupuy.
 2000 – Association of Journalist of Catalonia (Col·legi de Periodistes de Catalunya), Barcelona. Xavier Miserachs, un luxe periodístic.
 2004 – Photoespaña 04, Barcelona. With Terré and Masats.
 2006 – Josef Sudek Gallery, Praga. Barcelona. Blanco y Negro.
 2007 – Centre Fontana d'Or, Girona. Francesc Català-Roca i Xavier Miserachs. Dues mirades al territori de la Costa Brava.
 2008 – Galería Hartmann, Barcelona. En clau de dona.

Awards 
 1954 – I Trofeo Luis Navarro
 1997 – II Hojas de contactos. memorias, II Premi Gaziel
1998 – Life, Creu de Sant Jordi

Further reading 
 López Mondéjar, P. (1999). Historia de la fotografía en España. Barcelona: Lunwerg editores. pp. 235–236. .
 Vázquez Montalbán, M. (2001) (en catalán). Barcelona dos mil anys i un dia : primer Premi de fotografia Xavier Miserachs.  Barcelona: Ketres Editora, S.L. .
 Colita; Miserachs, X. (1988). Colita, Xavier Miserachs. Febrés, X.. Ayuntamiento de Barcelona. Dirección de Servicios Editoriales.. .
 Català-Roca, F.; Terré, L. (2007) (en catalán). F. Català-Roca i X. Miserachs, dues mirades al territori : memòries de la Costa Brava. Gerona: Fundación Caixa de Girona. .
 Xavier Miserachs. Barcelona: Fundación La Caixa. 1992. .
 Maspons, O. (1998) (en castellano, inglés). Xavier Miserachs. Madrid: T.F. Editores. .
 Coombs, H.; Miserachs, X.;Maspons, O.; Pumphrey, D.; Dodman, J.F. (2007). Xavier Miserachs. Madrid: La Fábrica. .
 Arrouye, J. (2004). «Le ténebrisme de Xavier Miserachs». Cahiers d'études romanes (11):  pp. 101–110. .

References

External links 

 
 Xavier Miserachs Archive on Flickr
 Miserach's Portfolio

Spanish photojournalists
Artists from Catalonia
Photographers from Catalonia
People from Barcelona
University of Barcelona alumni
1937 births
1998 deaths
Street photographers
Deaths from cancer in Spain